Shaheen Holloway (born October 7, 1976) is an American men's basketball coach and former player who is the coach for the Seton Hall Pirates. He played college basketball at Seton Hall from 1996 to 2000. A point guard, Holloway played professionally for seven seasons. He served as the head coach for the Saint Peter's Peacocks from 2018 to 2022, where he led the 15th seed Peacocks to the Elite Eight in the 2022 NCAA Division I Men's Basketball Tournament.

High school
Holloway was considered one of the top point guard prospects in his high school class playing for St. Patrick, with some of the scouting reports naming him as the best point guard in the nation. He and Mike Bibby were consistently named as the two best point guards of the 1996 class. Selected 3 times in the All-State selection, in 1995 he was amongst the top scorers of the Reebok Big Time Tournament with an average of 26.3 points per game, and he was selected to the Parade All-America Second Team. He averaged 22.5 points, 9.1 assists and 5.8 steals as a senior, for a total of 2,151 points, 727 assists and 540 steals during his time at St. Patrick, and was named to the Parade All-America second team (for the second year in a row) and was also named a McDonald's All-American. In the McDonald's All-American Game of 1996 Holloway was the starting point guard for the East team: he recorded 7 points, 8 assists and 6 steals, receiving the Most Valuable Player award.

College career
After considering offers from California, Duke, and Georgia Tech, Holloway accepted the scholarship offered by Seton Hall. Duke coach Mike Krzyzewski later told Holloway that he was the only recruit to not commit to Duke after twice visiting the school.

Holloway had a very solid freshman season, posting averages of 17.3 points and 6.3 assists per game; he was 5th in the Big East conference in scoring. He was selected for the Big East All-Rookie team and for the All-AAC second team. Despite his good season averages, he decided not to declare for an early entry in the NBA draft and continued his college career. His second season at Seton Hall was slightly worse than his rookie season and, despite leading the Big East in assists per game (6.5), he had worse averages in all the other major statistical categories. His junior season was his worst of his college career and all his statistics declined. This was the only season in which he averaged a single digit in points per game (9.3). His senior season was his best and he was one of the main players of the Seton Hall team that reached the 2000 NCAA tournament Sweet Sixteen. He focused more on his 3-point shooting, improving his percentage to 40.3%. For this season, showing a better overall performance, Holloway was named the Big East Most Improved Player in 2000. In 978 total minutes played he was Seton Hall top player in assists per game, and he was second in scoring and rebounding (the top rebounder was future NBA center Samuel Dalembert). In the 2000 NCAA Tournament, he scored 27 points, including the winning basket with 1.9 seconds left in overtime, in the Pirates 72–71 first-round victory over seventh-seeded Oregon. The next game against second-seeded Temple, Holloway suffered an ankle injury on a successful fastbreak drive for a layup, ending his season.

He finished his career at Seton Hall with 1,588 career points and he became the all-time assist leader, with 681 assists, a record that he still holds as of 2018. In 2012 he was inducted in the Seton Hall Athletics Hall of Fame. He played a total of 3,865 minutes with the Pirates.

College statistics
Sources

|-
| align="left" | 1996–97
| align="left" | Seton Hall
| 28 || 28 || 37.4 || .364 || .341 || .544 || 3.8 || 6.3 || 2.8 || 0.4 || 17.3
|-
| align="left" | 1997–98
| align="left" | Seton Hall
| 29 || 28 || 36.7 || .344 || .242 || .629 || 3.8 || 6.5 || 2.1 || 0.2 || 15.0
|-
| align="left" | 1998–99
| align="left" | Seton Hall
| 28 || 22 || 27.7 || .358 || .221 || .675 || 2.8 || 5.0 || 1.5 || 0.1 || 9.3
|-
| align="left" | 1999–00
| align="left" | Seton Hall
| 31 || 31 || 31.5 || .447 || .403 || .780 || 5.1 || 5.6 || 1.7 || 0.0 || 13.2
|-
| align="left" | Career
| align="left" | 
| 116 || 109 || 33.3 || .374 || .305 || .640 || 3.9 || 5.9 || 2.0 || 0.2 || 13.7
|-

Professional career
After his senior season Holloway became automatically eligible for the 2000 NBA draft, but he was not drafted by any of the NBA teams. He was invited to the 2000 Summer League by the New York Knicks and the Washington Wizards. He was drafted in the seventh round of the 2000 USBL Draft by the Long Island Surf (67th overall pick). He played professionally for Israeli team Hapoel Holon in 2000–01, averaging 15.5 points and 4 assists in 4 games played. In 2001–02 he played for the Chicago Skyliners. For the 2002–03 season he signed with the Chester Jets, and he also played for the London Towers. In 2003 he transferred to Turkey, and signed with İstanbul Teknik Üniversitesi: there he averaged 12.2 points, 2.6 rebounds and 4.4 assists in 19 games played. He also played for Ratiopharm Ulm in 2004–05. In 2005 he returned in the United States, and signed with the Jersey Express. He also played for Marineros de Puerto Plata in the Dominican Republic, where he ranked second in the Liga Nacional de Baloncesto in assists per game (4.4 in 15 games). His last team was the Pennsylvania ValleyDawgs for the 2006–07 season.

During his professional career he played in the Dominican Republic, Germany, Israel, Turkey, United Kingdom and Venezuela, in addition to the United States.

Coaching career
After retirement from his playing career, Holloway was initially included in the Seton Hall staff, but he then transferred to Iona College in 2007; he spent three seasons there, helping coach Kevin Willard. When Willard became Seton Hall head coach, Holloway followed him as one of his assistant coaches.

On April 10, 2018, Holloway was hired by Saint Peter's University as their new head coach. On March 17, 2022, Holloway led his team to an upset overtime victory in the NCAA tournament over the second seeded Kentucky Wildcats. Two days later, on March 19, 2022, Holloway advanced Saint Peter's to the Sweet Sixteen for the first time in school history, with a 70–60 win over the seventh seeded Murray State Racers, ending its 21-game winning streak. With the win, his team became just the third No. 15 seed in tournament history to advance to the second weekend of the tournament. On March 25, 2022, he coached Saint Peter's University to a victory over third seeded Purdue 67–64. This made Saint Peter’s the first No. 15 seed to advance to the Elite 8 in NCAA tournament history, where their Cinderella run ended with a 49–69 loss to No. 8 seed North Carolina.

On March 30, 2022, Holloway was hired by Seton Hall University as their new head coach.

Head coaching record

Bibliography

References

External links
 Sports-Reference.com College Basketball statistics
Israeli League statistics
Seton Hall Pirates profile

1976 births
Living people
20th-century African-American sportspeople
21st-century African-American sportspeople
African-American basketball players
American expatriate basketball people in the Dominican Republic
American expatriate basketball people in Germany
American expatriate basketball people in Israel
American expatriate basketball people in Turkey
American expatriate basketball people in the United Kingdom
American men's basketball coaches
American men's basketball players
Basketball coaches from New York (state)
Basketball players from New York City
Cheshire Jets players
College men's basketball head coaches in the United States
Hapoel Holon players
Iona Gaels men's basketball coaches
İstanbul Teknik Üniversitesi B.K. players
London Towers players
McDonald's High School All-Americans
Parade High School All-Americans (boys' basketball)
Point guards
Ratiopharm Ulm players
Saint Peter's Peacocks men's basketball coaches
Seton Hall Pirates men's basketball coaches
Seton Hall Pirates men's basketball players
Sportspeople from Queens, New York
The Patrick School alumni